The 4th Canadian Parliament was in session from 13 February 1879 until 18 May 1882.  The membership was set by the 1878 federal election on 17 September 1878. It was dissolved prior to the 1882 election.

It was controlled by a Conservative/Liberal-Conservative majority under Prime Minister Sir John A. Macdonald and the 3rd Canadian Ministry.  The Official Opposition was the Liberal Party, first led by Alexander Mackenzie, and then by Edward Blake.

The Speaker was Joseph Godéric Blanchet. See also List of Canadian electoral districts 1873-1882 for a list of the ridings in this parliament.

There were four sessions of the 4th Parliament:

List of members
Following is a full list of members of the fourth parliament listed first by province, then by electoral district.

Electoral districts denoted by an asterisk (*) indicates that district was represented by two members.

British Columbia

Manitoba

New Brunswick

Nova Scotia

Ontario

Prince Edward Island

Quebec

By-elections

References

Succession

04th Canadian parliament
1879 establishments in Canada
1882 disestablishments in Canada
1879 in Canada
1880 in Canada
1881 in Canada
1882 in Canada